Batomys is a genus of rodent endemic to the Philippines. It has six extant described species.

Species
Genus Batomys - Luzon and Mindanao forest rats, 7 species recognized, six extant and one extinct:
Large-toothed hairy-tailed rat, Batomys dentatus 
Luzon hairy-tailed rat, Batomys granti 
Hamiguitan hairy-tailed rat, Batomys hamiguitan  
Dinagat hairy-tailed rat, Batomys russatus  
Mindanao hairy-tailed rat, Batomys salomonseni 
Batomys uragon 
 Batomys cagayanensis

References

 
Rodents of the Philippines
Rodent genera
Taxa named by Oldfield Thomas
Batomys